The Midland metropolitan area may refer to:

The Midland, Texas metropolitan area, United States
The Midland, Michigan metropolitan area, United States

See also
Midland (disambiguation)